Robert B. Harris (born 1922- died 2014) was an American multihull sailboat designer.

Career
He first became interested in multihulls after seeing a 40-foot catamaran in Hawaii, built by Alfred Kumalai and Rudy Choy.

Designs
Please note that this list is partial.

Monohulls
Vancouver 25
Vancouver 42
Vancouver 36 (Harris) (1977)

Catamarans
Naramatac (1948)
Sunburner (1972)

Trimarans
Eclipse

Books
Harris has published three books.
Modern Sailing Catamarans (1960)
Racing and Cruising Trimarans (1970)
Tracks on the Water: My Life in Yacht Design (2008)

References

Robert B. Harris